Vanillic may refer to:

 Vanillic acid, an oxidized form of vanillin
 Vanillic alcohol, a synonym for vanillyl alcohol, a derivative of vanillin
 Vanillic aldehyde, a synonym for vanillin